Hackmania is a genus of cribellate araneomorph spiders in the family Dictynidae, and was first described by Pekka T. Lehtinen in 1967.  it contains only two species: H. prominula and H. saphes.

References

Araneomorphae genera
Dictynidae
Holarctic spiders
Spiders of the United States
Taxa named by Pekka T. Lehtinen